Darren Spedale is an entrepreneur and author best known for founding the national entrepreneurship organization StartOut. 

Spedale's work in entrepreneurship began as the co-founder of a consumer internet start-up in 1998. Upon the sale of this company in 2000, Spedale received his MBA from the Stanford Graduate School of Business and his JD from Stanford Law School. In 2008, he co-founded the media company A-List Global Media LLC, the creators of PopCardz trading cards and other consumer products for the "tween" market.

In 2009 Spedale founded StartOut, a nonprofit organization dedicated to fostering and developing entrepreneurship in the gay and lesbian community. He became the organization's Founding Chairman of the Board and remained Chairman until 2012. 

More recently, Spedale founded the company FamilyByDesign, which is focused on the development of modern family structures. Spedale's research on modern families began in the mid-1990s while an undergraduate at Duke University, where he published an honors thesis on opposite-sex and same-sex domestic partnership laws in the United States. The arguments in his thesis were later used by Duke faculty and staff to help secure domestic partnership benefits for Duke employees.

In 1996, having been awarded a Fulbright Fellowship after his undergraduate work, Spedale enrolled at the University of Copenhagen and spent two years in Denmark researching how northern Europe was recognizing non-traditional families. As a subset of this research, Spedale analyzed the Scandinavian registered partnership laws, which beginning in 1989 (in Denmark) allowed same-sex couples to enter into legal unions and thereby receive the rights and benefits of marriage. Spedale's Scandinavian research was widely published in Hawaii in the aftermath of Baehr v. Miike in which three same-sex couples argued that Hawaii's prohibition of same-sex marriage violated the state constitution.

In June 2006, his first book, entitled Gay Marriage: For Better or For Worse?, was published by Oxford University Press (with co-author Professor William Eskridge).  He has since published articles on his research in such publications as the Wall Street Journal and Slate Magazine, and has appeared on such TV shows as the O'Reilly Factor to discuss his findings.

In December 2013 and again in March 2019, Business Insider named Spedale one of the "Most Important Gay People in Tech".

References

External links 
Spedale on the Today Show discussing co-parenting
Spedale on CNN News discussing parenting partnerships
New York Times article on Spedale and StartOut
Spedale article on Scandinavia as appeared during the Hawaii debate over Baehr v. Lewin
A more recent article on the Scandinavian registered partnership laws
For a more in-depth analysis by Spedale (with Eskridge and Hans Ytterberg)
Wall Street Journal article (27 October 2006)
Spedale debates Bill O'Reilly on same-sex marriage (with co-author Eskridge)
WSJ article discussing Family By Design
Family By Design profiled as part of the "modern family" movement
New York Times article on Family By Design quoting Spedale
Spedale ringing NYSE Opening Bell on behalf of StartOut

Living people
Duke University alumni
Stanford Law School alumni
Stanford Graduate School of Business alumni
Place of birth missing (living people)
Year of birth missing (living people)